Gateway is an unincorporated community and a U.S. Post Office located in Mesa County, Colorado, United States.

Description
The Gateway Post Office has the ZIP Code 81522. A post office called Gateway has been in operation since 1903. The community most likely was named for a rock formation near the original town site.

Geography
Gateway is located at  (38.677661,-108.980264).

Climate

According to the Köppen Climate Classification system, Gateway has a cold semi-arid climate, abbreviated "BSk" on climate maps.

Arts and culture
Gateway is home to the Gateway Canyons Resort and Auto Museum.  Established by Discovery Channel founder John S. Hendricks, this resort claims to blend in naturally to the landscape that surrounds it.
Tourists may enjoy kayaking, off-road tours, guided fly-fishing, horseback riding, air tours and more at the Gateway Canyons Resort. To the north lies the Palisade, a three-mile (4.8-km) long butte.

Gateway Canyons resort is host to several foot races each year and a large bike race that attracts some of the best riders from around the country.

See also

References

External links

 Gateway Canyons Resort

Unincorporated communities in Colorado
Unincorporated communities in Mesa County, Colorado